Antonio Sola Villalba (born 24 January 2001) is a Spanish footballer who plays for Deportivo Aragón as a left back.

Club career
Born in Utrillas, Teruel, Aragon, Sola joined FC Barcelona's La Masia in 2015, after representing Real Zaragoza, CD Giner Torrero and CD Utrillas. On 27 July 2020, after finishing his formation, he returned to Zaragoza on a two-year contract, being assigned to the reserves in Tercera División.

Sola made his senior debut on 18 October 2020, starting in a 1–1 Tercera División away draw against CF Illueca. He scored his first goal on 15 November, netting the winner in a 2–1 home success over UD Fraga.

Sola made his first team debut on 22 November 2020, coming on 59th-minute substitute for Sergio Bermejo and scoring an equalizing own goal the following minute of a 1–2 away loss against SD Ponferradina.

Career statistics

Club

Personal life
Sola's twin brother Raúl is also a footballer. A right-back, who plays for CD Brea.

References

External links

2001 births
Living people
Sportspeople from the Province of Teruel
Spanish twins
Twin sportspeople
Spanish footballers
Footballers from Aragon
Association football defenders
Segunda División players
Tercera División players
Tercera Federación players
Real Zaragoza B players
Real Zaragoza players